Peter Kurzeck (June 10, 1943 – November 25, 2013) was a German writer.

Life 

Peter Kurzeck was born on June 10, 1943 in Tachau, Reichsgau Sudetenland, Nazi Germany. In 1946, his family moved to Germany and Kurzeck was raised in Staufenberg near Giessen, Hesse. As a young man, he wrote for local newspapers and magazines. In 1977, he moved to Frankfurt am Main, Hesse, Germany. Since the mid-1990s, Kurzeck has been working on a multi-volume autobiographical novel project entitled Das alte Jahrhundert (The Old Century) which, according to its narrative framework, is based in Frankfurt am Main in 1984.

He died on November 25, 2013 in Frankfurt am Main.

Legacy 
Kurzeck's daughter Carina inherited the rights to his work. While most of his books were previously published by Stroemfeld Verlag, in December 2018 a change of publisher to Verlag Schöffling & Co. was announced, which is to bring out four more estate volumes.

Works 
 Der Nußbaum gegenüber vom Laden, in dem du dein Brot kaufst. Stroemfeld/Roter Stern, Basel/Frankfurt am Main 1979, .
 Das schwarze Buch. Stroemfeld/Roter Stern, Basel/Frankfurt am Main 1982, .
 Kein Frühling. Stroemfeld/Roter Stern, Basel/Frankfurt am Main 1987, . Erweiterte Neuauflage 2007, .
 Keiner stirbt. Stroemfeld/Roter Stern, Basel/Frankfurt am Main 1990, .
 Mein Bahnhofsviertel. Stroemfeld/Roter Stern, Basel/Frankfurt am Main 1991, .
 Vor den Abendnachrichten. Wunderhorn, Heidelberg 1996, .
 Übers Eis. Stroemfeld/Roter Stern, Basel/Frankfurt am Main 1997, .
 Als Gast. Stroemfeld/Roter Stern, Basel/Frankfurt am Main 2003, .
 Ein Kirschkern im März. Stroemfeld/Roter Stern, Frankfurt am Main/Basel 2004, .
 Oktober und wer wir selbst sind. Stroemfeld/Roter Stern, Frankfurt am Main/Basel 2007, .
 Vorabend. Stroemfeld/Roter Stern, Frankfurt am Main/Basel 2011, .
 Bis er kommt. Stroemfeld/Roter Stern, Frankfurt am Main/Basel 2015, .
 Der vorige Sommer und der Sommer davor. Schöffling & Co., Frankfurt am Main 2019, .
 Kommt kein Zirkus ins Dorf? (Hörspiel, HR 1987), Edition Literarischer Salon im Focus Verlag, Gießen 1987.
 Der Sonntagsspaziergang. (Hörspiel, HR 1992).
 Stuhl, Tisch, Lampe. supposé, Köln 2004. (Hörbuch-CD).
 Ein Sommer, der bleibt. Peter Kurzeck erzählt das Dorf seiner Kindheit. Konzeption und Regie: Klaus Sander. Erzähler: Peter Kurzeck. supposé, Berlin 2007. (4-CD-Box).
 Peter Kurzeck liest aus „Kein Frühling“.  Stroemfeld Verlag, Frankfurt am Main 2007. (Hörbuch, 4 CDs).
 Peter Kurzeck liest „Oktober und wer wir selbst sind“. Stroemfeld Verlag, Frankfurt am Main 2008. (Hörbuch, 7 CDs).
 Da fährt mein Zug. Peter Kurzeck erzählt. Konzeption und Regie: Klaus Sander. Erzähler: Peter Kurzeck. supposé, Berlin 2010, . (Audio-CD).
 Mein wildes Herz. Peter Kurzeck erzählt. Konzeption und Regie: Klaus Sander. Erzähler: Peter Kurzeck. supposé, Berlin 2011, . (2 Audio-CDs).
 „Unerwartet Marseille.“ Peter Kurzeck erzählt. Stroemfeld Verlag, Frankfurt am Main 2012. (Hörbuch, 2 CDs).
 Für immer. Peter Kurzeck erzählt sein Schreiben. Konzeption und Regie: Klaus Sander. Erzähler: Peter Kurzeck. supposé, Berlin 2016, . (Audio-CD).
 Ralph Schock, „Wenn ich schreibe, kann mir nichts passieren.“ Gespräch mit Peter Kurzeck. In: Sinn und Form, 5/2011, S. 624–633.

Awards 

 1988: Literaturpreis des Landkreises Gießen
 1989: Stipendium Künstlerhaus Edenkoben
 1989: Kunstpreis der Stadt Cloppenburg
 1991: Alfred-Döblin-Preis
 1992: Stipendium Künstlerhof Schreyahn
 1994: Joseph-Breitbach-Preis
 1995: Kester-Haeusler-Ehrengabe der Deutschen Schillerstiftung
 1999: Großer Literaturpreis der Bayerischen Akademie der Schönen Künste
 2000: Hans-Erich-Nossack-Preis
 2000/2001: Stadtschreiber von Bergen
 2004: Preis der Literaturhäuser
 2004: Kranichsteiner Literaturpreis
 2006: George-Konell-Preis der Landeshauptstadt Wiesbaden
 2007: Georg-Christoph-Lichtenberg-Preis
 2007: Calwer Hermann-Hesse-Stipendium
 2008: Goetheplakette der Stadt Frankfurt am Main
 2008: Moldaustipendium
 2009: "Hörbuch des Jahres 2008" of the hr2-Hörbuchbestenliste for Ein Sommer, der bleibt – Peter Kurzeck erzählt das Dorf seiner Kindheit
 2010: Robert-Gernhardt-Förderpreis for the novel Vorabend, the fifth volume of his autobiographical chronicle Das alte Jahrhundert
 2011: Honorary citizen of the City of Staufenberg
 2011: Grimmelshausen-Preis
 2011: Werner-Bergengruen-Preis
 2013: Großer Sudetendeutscher Kulturpreis
 2014: Place of the former Schule von Staufenberg (school of Staufenberg) was named to Peter-Kurzeck-Platz.

Literature 
 Mechthild Curtius: Peter Kurzeck „Zwangsvorstellung: Dass ich nichts vergessen darf!“ Interview, in: Dies. (Hrsg.): Autorengespräche. Verwandlung der Wirklichkeit. Fischer, Frankfurt am Main 1991, . S. 155–168.
 Jörg Magenau: Die Suche nach der verlorenen Zeit. Peter Kurzecks Romane „Kein Frühling“ und „Keiner stirbt“. In: Walter Delabar, Erhard Schütz (Hrsg.): Deutschsprachige Literatur der 70er und 80er Jahre. Darmstadt 1997, S. 236–253.
 Sabine Sistig: Wandel der Ich-Identität in der Postmoderne? Zeit und Erzählen in Wolfgang Hilbigs „Ich“ und Peter Kurzecks „Keiner stirbt“. Königshausen u. Neumann, Würzburg 2003,  (= Epistemata/Reihe Literaturwissenschaft, 407.).
 Beate Tröger: Gehen, um zu schreiben. Peter Kurzecks autobiographisches Romanprojekt. In: Hans Richard Brittnacher, Magnus Klaue (Hrsg.): Unterwegs. Zur Poetik des Vagabundentums im 20. Jahrhundert. Böhlau, Köln/Weimar/Wien 2008. S. 261–276.
 „Sowieso verlauf ich mich gern!“ Gehen, Fehl-Gehen und Umwege als strukturgebendes Element bei Peter Kurzeck. In:  Matthias Däumer, Maren Lickhardt, Christian Riedel, Christine Waldschmidt (Hg.): Irrwege. Zu Ästhetik und Hermeneutik des Fehlgehens. Winter, Heidelberg 2010, S. 233–249 (= Studien zur historischen Poetik, 5).
 Maria Kuwilsky: Autopoietiken im Medium Literatur als Gedächtnis von Gegenwart und Zeit. Beobachtungen von Arno Schmidt, Uwe Johnson, Walter Kempowski und Peter Kurzeck. Egon Verlag, Würzburg 2013, .
 Christian Riedel / Matthias Bauer (Hrsg.): Text + Kritik 199. Peter Kurzeck. edition text + kritik, München 2013. .
 Christian Riedel: Peter Kurzecks Erzählkosmos. Idylle – Romantik – Blues. Aisthesis, Bielefeld 2016,  (= Philologie und Kulturgeschichte, Bd. 3).

References

External links 

 Literature from and about Peter Kurzeck in the German National Library
 Material from and about Peter Kurzeck at Poetenladen
 Peter Kurzeck on IMDb

1943 births
German male writers
2013 deaths